Edward Martins (born 17 April 1933) is a Liberian sprinter. He competed in the men's 4 × 100 metres relay at the 1956 Summer Olympics.

References

External links
 

1933 births
Living people
Athletes (track and field) at the 1956 Summer Olympics
Liberian male sprinters
Liberian male long jumpers
Olympic athletes of Liberia
Place of birth missing (living people)